Edward Freeman (16 October 1880 – 22 February 1964) was an English cricketer. He played for Essex between 1904 and 1912.

References

External links

1880 births
1964 deaths
English cricketers
Essex cricketers
People from Lewisham
Cricketers from Greater London
Dorset cricketers